Chris Raudman (August 26, 1963 - October 28, 2021) was an American stock car racing driver. He was a regular competitor in the NASCAR Featherlite Southwest Tour, and was the series' 1996 champion; he also attempted to qualify for one NASCAR Winston Cup Series race during his career.

Career
The brother of Craig Raudman, Chris Raudman began his racing career competing in Late model stock car at Shasta Raceway Park; in 1994, he won the track's Late Model championship. He finished tenth in the Sunbelt Region standings of NASCAR's Winston Racing Series that season.

In 1996, Raudman moved full-time to the NASCAR Featherlite Southwest Tour, a regional late-model-style series, competing for the series' Rookie of the Year title. In addition to winning Rookie of the Year, he won two races on his way to beating Bryan Germone by 160 points for the series championship. Raudman also won the series' prestigious "Winter Heat Series" race at Tucson Raceway Park that year. In 1997, Raudman returned to the series, winning three races and finishing second in the series standings to Germone.

In 1998, Raudman attempted to make his debut in the NASCAR Winston Cup Series, driving a family-owned Chevrolet at Sears Point Raceway for the Save Mart/Kragen 350. He was unable to complete a qualifying lap and failed to make the field for the race. Raudman's racing career slowed afterwards, only making occasional starts, and standing by as a relief driver for his brother following an injury suffered by the latter in 2000.

Raudman died on October 28, 2021.

Motorsports career results

NASCAR
(key) (Bold - Pole position awarded by qualifying time. Italics - Pole position earned by points standings or practice time. * – Most laps led.)

Winston Cup Series

References
Citations

Bibliography

External links

Living people
1963 births
People from Redding, California
Racing drivers from California
NASCAR drivers